The 2013 Summer Universiade, held in Kazan, Tatarstan, Russia, used a large number of new and reconstructed venues for the various events, residential complexes for the athletes, and transportation infrastructure.

Universiade Village 

The Universiade Village is a reception, accreditation, accommodation and information centre of the Games. Village will host over 13,000 people. Total area of the residential zone is 274,000 sq. metres. It was built mainly in 2010-2011

Sport venues

All venues (except Skeet shooting Centre in Verkhneuslonsky District) are situated in Kazan city.

References 

2013 Summer Universiade
Universiade venues